The following is a timeline of the history of the city of Fuzhou, Fujian Province, China.

Prior to 10th century

 2nd century BCE - City called "Ye."
 2nd century CE - City renamed "Houguan."
 220 CE - Hans in power (approximate date).
 527 - Dizang Temple founded.
 789 - City "divided into two counties."
 799 - Wu Ta "Black Pagoda" built.

10th-13th centuries
 901 - City outer walls built.
 904 - Bai Ta "White Pagoda" built.
 909 - City becomes capital of Kingdom of Min.
 915 - Yongquan Temple founded.
 948 - City renamed "Fuzhou."
 1283 - Provincial capital relocated to Fuzhou from Zeytoon.

19th century
 1843 - Port opens to European commerce per Treaty of Nanking.
 1845 - British consulate established.
 1847 - American Presbyterian Mission active.
 1860 - St. John's Church dedicated.
 1871 - Foochow Arsenal constructed.
 1874 - Flood.
 1878 - 30 August: Demonstration against missionaries.
 1881 - Anglo-Chinese College founded.
 1884 - 23–26 August: Battle of Fuzhou.
 1892 - Population: 635,000 (estimate).

20th century

 1907 - Fujian Normal University founded.
 1911 - Uprising.
 1933 - November: Fujian People's Government headquartered in Fuzhou.
 1936 - Fujian Agriculture and Forestry University founded.
 1937 - Fujian Medical University founded.
 1938 - Japanese occupation begins.
 1945 - Japanese occupation ends.
 1949 - Fujian Ribao newspaper in publication.
 1956 - Railway begins operating.
 1957 - Population: 616,000.
 1958 - Fuzhou University founded.
 1966 - Saint Dominic's Cathedral closes.
 1979 - Flower Lane Church reopens.
 1983 - Fuzhou administration formed into 5 districts and 8 counties.
 1985 - Fuzhou Economic & Technological Development Zone established.
 1990 - Population: 1,395,739.
 1991 - Fuzhou High-tech Development Zone and Fuzhou Science and Technology Park approved.
 1992 - Fuzhou Free Trade Zone established.
 1997 - Fuzhou Changle International Airport inaugurated.

21st century

 2005 - Fuzhou Export Processing Zone established.
 2006 - Population: 1,457,626 (estimate).
 2008 - April: Protests.
 2010 - Yuan Rongxiang becomes CPC Party chief.
 2012 - November: World Summit on Internet and Multimedia held.
2019: coronavirus (covid-19)

See also
 Fuzhou history
 List of universities and colleges in Fuzhou
 Urbanization in China

References

Bibliography

Published in the 18th-19th centuries
 
 
 
 
 
 

Published in the 20th century

External links

Fuzhou